The Packard Motor Car Company Building, also known as the Press Building, is a historic office building located at 317–321 N. Broad Street between Pearl and Wood Streets in the Callowhill neighborhood of Philadelphia, Pennsylvania. The structure was built in 1910–11 and was designed by Albert Kahn of the noted Detroit architectural firm of Kahn & Wilby. It is a nine-story, steel framed, reinforced concrete building – one of the first uses of that material in a commercial building. Clad in terra cotta and featuring an ornamented canopy and a prominent overhanging roof, the building housed a showroom and new car inventory space for the Packard Motor Car Company. The showroom was remodeled in 1927 by Philip Tyre.  In November 1928, the building became the headquarters of the Philadelphia Record newspaper, which it remained until the Record folded in a 1947 strike.

The building was added to the National Register of Historic Places in 1980.  It is a contributing property to the Callowhill Industrial Historic District.  The building was renovated into apartments in 1986 by Bower Lewis Thrower and John Milner Associates.

See also
 
 Packard Motor Car Dealership (Buffalo, New York)
 Packard Motor Car Dealership (Dayton, Ohio)

References
Notes

External links
 
 The Packard Motor Car Building | Apartments in Center City Philadelphia

Commercial buildings on the National Register of Historic Places in Philadelphia
Office buildings completed in 1911
Historic district contributing properties in Pennsylvania
Packard
Auto dealerships on the National Register of Historic Places
Callowhill, Philadelphia
Motor vehicle buildings and structures on the National Register of Historic Places
Transportation buildings and structures on the National Register of Historic Places in Pennsylvania
1911 establishments in Pennsylvania